The 2008–09 Africa Cup is the ninth edition of highest level rugby union tournament in Africa. The competition involves twelve teams that are divided into two zones (North and South). Each zone is then divided into two pools of three. Each pool winner then qualifies for a semi-final; the semi-final winners then play each other in the final.

Teams

Format
The tournament will be used as the first stage of qualification for Rugby World Cup 2011. The top two teams will progress in the World Cup and in the Africa Cup, which will be the main tournament for the African qualifiers. Swaziland, Nigeria and Botswana have been added to the qualification process as they possess an IRB ranking. A two-legged playoff between the two lowest ranked teams from the south (Botswana and Swaziland) and the two lowest ranked teams from the north (Cameroon and Nigeria) will begin the tournament to take the competition numbers from 14 to 12 to make the group stage four groups of three teams.

Division 1 (Africa Cup)

Playoff round

Pool Stage
Pool winners qualify for the semi-finals. Top teams also progress to second stage of world cup qualification, in the Africa Cup. Pools determined through world rankings.

Bonus point system: 4 points for a win, 2 for a draw, 0 for a loss, 1 point for scoring four tries in a game, 1 point for losing by seven or less.

Pool A
{| class="wikitable"
|-
!width=165|Team
!width=30|P
!width=30|W
!width=30|D
!width=30|Lost
!width=30|For
!width=30|Ag.
!width=40|Diff.
!width=30|TB
!width=30|LB
!width=30|Points
!width=200|Notes
|- bgcolor=#ccffcc align=center
|align=left| 
|2||2||0||0||48||31||+17||1||0||9 ||To semifinals
|- align=center
|align=left| 
|1||0||0||1||10||13||-3||0||1||1 ||to 2009 Africa Throphy North
|- align=center
|align=left| 
|1||0||0||1||21||35||-14||0||0||0||to 2009 Africa Throphy South
|}

Pool B
{| class="wikitable"
|-
!width=165|Team
!width=30|P
!width=30|W
!width=30|D
!width=30|Lost
!width=30|For
!width=30|Ag.
!width=40|Diff.
!width=30|TB
!width=30|LB
!width=30|Points
!width=200|Notes
|- bgcolor=#ccffcc align=center
|align=left|  
|2||2||0||0||53||18||+35||1||0||9||to semifinals
|- align=center
|align=left| 
|2||1||0||1||38||39||-1||1||0||5||to 2009 Africa Throphy North
|- align=center
|align=left| 
|2||0||0||2||27||61||-34||0||0||0||to 2009 Africa Throphy South
|}

Pool C
{| class="wikitable"
|-
!width=165|Team
!width=30|P
!width=30|W
!width=30|D
!width=30|Lost
!width=30|For
!width=30|Ag.
!width=40|Diff.
!width=30|TB
!width=30|LB
!width=30|Points
!width=200|Notes
|- bgcolor=#ccffcc align=center
|align=left| 
|2||2||0||0||60||25||+35||1||0||9||to semifinals
|- align=center
|align=left| 
|2||1||0||1||91||52||+39||1||0||5||to 2009 Africa Throphy North
|- align=center
|align=left| 
|2||0||0||2||18||92||-74||0||1||1||to 2009 Africa Throphy North
|}

Pool D
{| class="wikitable"
|-
!width=165|Team
!width=30|P
!width=30|W
!width=30|D
!width=30|Lost
!width=30|For
!width=30|Ag.
!width=40|Diff.
!width=30|TB
!width=30|LB
!width=30|Points
!width=200|Notes
|- bgcolor=#ccffcc align=center
|align=left| 
|2||2||0||0||59||32||+27||2||0||10||to semifinals
|- align=center
|align=left| 
|2||1||0||1||67||47||+20||1||0||5||to 2009 Africa Throphy South
|- align=center
|align=left| 
|2||0||0||2||25||72||-47||0||0||0||to 2009 Africa Throphy South
|}

Knockout stage

Semifinals
Semi finals and final of this edition of the Africa Cup are to take place in 2009 doubling as the final leg of African Rugby World Cup qualification.

 Tunisia won the series with aggregate results of 79-30

 Namibia won the series with aggregate results of 67-27

Final 

 Namibia won the series with aggregate results of 40-23

Division 2

Division 3

References

External links
 2008 Africa Rugby Format

2008-09
2008 rugby union tournaments for national teams
2008 in African rugby union
2009 rugby union tournaments for national teams
2009 in African rugby union